Mikhail Yevgenyevich Mizintsev (born 10 September 1962) is a Russian colonel general currently serving as the deputy minister of defence of Russia for overseeing logistics since 24 September 2022. Prior to this, he headed the National Defense Management Center of Russia.

He has commanded Russian forces during the Siege of Mariupol, during which several attacks on civilians have been reported (including airstrikes on the city's theatre and hospital) and denounced as war crimes, for which "Ukrainian military officials" have reportedly referred to Mizintsev as the "Butcher of Mariupol".

Military career 
Mizintsev began his military career in 1980, under the Soviet Union, and continued serving in the Russian Ground Forces after its dissolution.

Syrian civil war 
He allegedly orchestrated bombing campaigns during the Russian military intervention in the Syrian civil war, including at the Battle of Aleppo. He was accused of arranging a brutal bombing campaign that annihilated Aleppo.

Russo-Ukrainian war 
During the 2022 Russian invasion of Ukraine, Mizintsev has led troops during the Siege of Mariupol, reportedly taking a personal role in directing the siege. He has been accused of war crimes by multiple people, including Ukrainian human rights lawyer Oleksandra Matviichuk, who stated that he should be held accountable for war crimes at the International Criminal Court in The Hague.

Mizintsev has denied these accusations, blaming Ukrainian forces for creating "a terrible humanitarian catastrophe", accusing the Azov Battalion of hiding inside the drama theatre and hospital, and claiming he will allow the "safe exit" of anyone in Mariupol who surrenders. His claims have been refuted by sources which assert refugees are being attacked and sent to filtration camps.

On 24 September 2022, Mizintsev was appointed deputy minister of defence of Russia, replacing Dmitry Bulgakov.

Sanctions 
On 31 March 2022, British Foreign Secretary Liz Truss announced that Mizintsev was being added to the UK's sanctions list, alongside several Russian television hosts.

Sanctioned by Japan in January 2023 as a result of the 2022 Russian invasion of Ukraine

Sanctioned by New Zealand in relation to the 2022 Russian invasion of Ukraine.

Sanctioned by European Union in relation to the 2022 Russian invasion of Ukraine.

References 

1962 births

Living people
People from Vologda Oblast
Russian military personnel of the 2022 Russian invasion of Ukraine
Russian colonel generals
Russian military personnel of the Syrian civil war
Russian individuals subject to United Kingdom sanctions
Recipients of the Order "For Merit to the Fatherland", 3rd class
Recipients of the Order of Zhukov
Recipients of the Order of Honour (Russia)
Recipients of the Order "For Service to the Homeland in the Armed Forces of the USSR", 3rd class
Kiev Military College of Frunze alumni
Military Academy of the General Staff of the Armed Forces of Russia alumni
Russian individuals subject to European Union sanctions